Greenfield is a historic plantation house located near Charlotte Court House, Charlotte County, Virginia.  It was built in 1771 as the main residence and headquarters of a large forced-labor farm. It is a frame dwelling consisting of a five-bay, single-pile, two-story main section flanked by two-bay one-story wings. It is topped by a shallow gable roof and the rear elevation features a full-width shed roof gallery.

One of its former owners was Thomas Jackson Charlton IV, a physician from Savannah, Georgia. He inherited it from his mother-in-law.

It was listed on the National Register of Historic Places in 1973.

References

Plantation houses in Virginia
Houses on the National Register of Historic Places in Virginia
Houses completed in 1771
Houses in Charlotte County, Virginia
National Register of Historic Places in Charlotte County, Virginia